Jen Angel (January 28, 1975February 9, 2023) was a writer and media activist known for her work on Clamor Magazine and Maximum Rock'n'Roll.

Early life and education
Angel was born in Dearborn, Michigan to John and Pat Engel and started using the last name Angel in high school. She earned a degree in journalism in 1997 from Ohio State University.

Activism
Jen Angel began writing and publishing her personal zine, Fucktooth (1991-2000), while in high school. She continued her media activism through a variety of publications and organizing efforts. From 1996 to 2004, she was a co-editor of Zine Yearbook, a yearly anthology of writing from zines and underground publications. Angel coordinated the publication of Maximum Rock'n'roll from 1997 to 1998 which led to her temporary relocation from the Midwest to the Bay Area. She co-founded Clamor magazine with Jason Kucsma for which the Utne Reader profiled them in their Young Visionaries: 30 under 30 article in 2002. Her writing has been featured in magazines including Bitch, Punk Planet, and In These Times.

Angel helped organize the Underground Publishing Conference in Bowling Green, initially called the Midwest Zine Conference in 1999, which later became the Allied Media Conference, which continues annually in Detroit. She also founded Agency, an anarchist public relations project and Aid & Abet, an event management group. She was a core organizer of the Bay Area Anarchist Book Fair and helped organize the Bay Area Radical History Project which sought to connect newer activists from the Occupy movement with veteran activists from earlier movements.

Baking
Angel moved back to the Bay Area in 2006 and created her company Angel Cakes in 2008. Their retail shop opened in Oakland in March 2016. The shop offered 120 flavors of cupcakes and donated money and providing desserts for social justice efforts such as environmental justice, housing, and criminal justice reform.

Death and legacy
Angel was robbed in a bank parking lot on February 6, 2023, and then critically injured as a result. She died on February 9. Angel did not believe in "state violence, carceral punishment, or incarceration" and her loved ones has been pursuing restorative justice approaches in response to her death.

References

External links
 Personal website
 Clamor Magazine

1975 births
2023 deaths
21st-century American women writers
American anarchists
American bakers
American magazine founders
American magazine publishers (people)
American magazine writers
Ohio State University alumni
People from Dearborn, Michigan